The Croatian Hockey League Season for 2000–2001 resulted with KHL Medveščak winning the title for the fifth time in a row.

Teams
 KHL Mladost
 KHL Medveščak Zagreb
 KHL Zagreb
 HK Ina Sisak

Regular season

Playoffs

Semifinals
The semifinals on 13 and 16 February. 
Medvescak beat Sisak 2–0 in a best of three series. (23–2) and (23–3)
Zagreb beat Mladost in a best of three series. (8–3) and (5–2)

Finals
Medvescak beat Zagreb in a best of five series, by 3–0. Games were played on 23, 27 Feb., and 2 March.
Medvešcak Zagreb – KHL Zagreb (6-5OT) (4–2) (6–1)

Third place
Mladost beat Sisak in a best of five series, winning 3–0. Games were played on 23, 27 Feb., and 4 March. 
Mladost – INA Sisak (9–3) (10–8) (8–6)

Croatian Ice Hockey League
1
Croatian Ice Hockey League seasons